Aaron Diamond AIDS Research Center, often abbreviated as ADARC, is a medical research institution dedicated to finding a cure for HIV/AIDS. It is headed by scientist Dr. David Ho, who was the 1996 Time magazine Person of the Year, and is located in New York City.

Opening in 1991, the center was the brainchild of the Aaron Diamond Foundation headed by his widow Irene Diamond, the New York City Department of Health, the Public Health Research Institute and New York University School of Medicine. It became affiliated with Rockefeller University in 1996, and became part of Columbia University's medical school, Columbia University Vagelos College of Physicians and Surgeons, in 2019.

ADARC has already made several notable achievements in the fight against the epidemic.

In April 2017, According to the reports, TaiMed inked licensing agreement with the ADARC for bispecific monoclonal antibody technology.

References

External links
 Aaron Diamond AIDS Research Center Official site

Organizations established in 1991
HIV/AIDS research organisations
1991 establishments in New York City
Columbia University
Columbia University research institutes
Medical research institutes in New York (state)